Entenbach  is a river of Bavaria, Germany, which flows through the Englischer Garten of Munich.

See also
List of rivers of Bavaria

Rivers of Bavaria
Rivers of Germany